Close Quarters Combat System (also known as Defendu) is a modern martial art developed by William E. Fairbairn and Eric A. Sykes prior to World War II.  It is a hand-to-hand combat system based on practical experience mixed with Jujutsu and boxing that was developed to train the Shanghai Municipal Police, and was later taught in expanded form to Office of Strategic Services  and Special Operations Executive  members during World War II.

Development
Based on his training and knowledge in boxing, wrestling, Savate, Jujutsu, Judo and street fighting he was involved in during his police work, Fairbairn began to develop his own system of hand to hand combat, initially referring to it as "Defendu". It was designed to be simple to learn and to provide effective results. Fairbairn published his book, Defendu, in 1926 (re-printed as Scientific Self Defence in 1931), illustrating this method and it is here that the term "Defendu" first appeared. This confused early readers of the book, who assumed that the techniques within had been based mainly in the Eastern martial arts that Fairbairn had learned. Thus, in an attempt to highlight the originality of Fairbairn's material, the term did not appear in the 1931 edition of the book.

Fairbairn was called upon by the British to help train Allied troops in World War II. Fairbairn and others expanded on this system to create the Close Quarters Combat system that was then taught to the troops. This system was built on Defendu, but modified for military applications, rather than police and riot control.

The original Defendu was oriented towards self-defense and restraint, while the Close Quarters Combat system concentrated on rapid disabling of an opponent, with potentially lethal force. The militarized version of Defendu is described in the military manual All in fighting 1942, used as a supplement during WW2 CQB-training. This book was later published in a civilian edition, missing the chapters on bayonet-fighting and rifle sighting, under the name Get Tough! How To Win In Hand-To-Hand Fighting. As Taught To The British Commandos And The U.S. Armed Forces. Fairbairn's CQC-system is also described in Rex Applegate's book Kill or Get Killed.

Fairbairn published several more books on the subject of self-defense, all of which refer to Defendu only in relation to the earlier book.

Second World War
The start of the Second World War saw the Allied forces needing every advantage to give their soldiers and special forces a winning edge. They found one such edge in Fairbairn's system. Immediately, Fairbairn was commissioned in the British Commandos and ordered to teach a lethal version of his system at the Commando school in Scotland.

It was at this top secret Scottish location that Colonel Rex Applegate of the U.S. Army studied under Fairbairn. Through Col. Applegate and other instructors such as Col. Anthony Biddle, these highly effective skills were taught to U.S. troops including US Marines and Rangers, as well as OSS operatives and later to the FBI and CIA as the foundation of their basic training.

Once the British Commando School in Scotland was able to produce its own Fairbairn/Sykes qualified instructors, both men were transferred. Fairbairn to North America, and Sykes to SOE, where he trained special agents for behind the lines duties . Fairbairn's 'special assignment' in Oshawa, Ontario, Canada, was to teach his system to Allied special forces at the most highly classified training operation of WWII, Camp X. Agents were trained in depth to dispose of their enemy quickly and quietly with brutal effectiveness. Following his instruction at Camp X, Fairbairn was rejoined by Col. Applegate to form the United States Camp B, now known as Camp David.

This introduction of 'The Fairbairn Fighting System' at Camp X in conjunction with input from many highly skilled instructors with various backgrounds and fighting skills was the beginning of the evolution of Defendu. As close quarters battle or unarmed combat training progressed throughout this period, it was added and refined utilising western fighting principles.

Basic principles
Defendu encourages its practitioner to end a confrontation as quickly as possible using "rude" means by rapidly attacking vital spot area (such as the groin, throat, side of the neck, shin, eyes, ears, etc.) by using only several pragmatic and powerful strikes. These strikes are taught as a method and not as disconnected isolated strikes found in traditional martial arts. Done properly, these strikes will "chain" at each other just like boxing. Defendu was also designed to be able to be mastered in mere days due to the extremely compressed curriculum. Students are also taught to always take initiative, employ artifice, and remain at offense (as no block or parry were found in the system).

See also
World War II combatives
All-In Fighting Manual
Fairbairn–Sykes fighting knife

References

Further reading
Defendu, W. E. Fairbairn  
The Close-Combat Files of Colonel Rex Applegate, Rex Applegate, Chuck Melson
Tommy Moore from the Bartitsu Lab UK will be publishing a Fairbairn Combatives self defence book titled: "The Shanghai School of Streetfighting" in September 2020

External links
The Source, Peter Robins, American Combatives
Shanghai Municipal Police, Robert Bickers
Fairbairn's Gutter Fighting 
W E Fairbairn Gentleman & Warrior The Shanghai Years (2005), Peter Robins
International Defendo Federation 
Defendo Magyarország 
Defendu Association Poland
Comsass International Combative Sciences Association

Hybrid martial arts
Hand to hand tactics
European martial arts
Law enforcement techniques